Assoli is a prefecture located in the Kara Region of Togo. The capital city is Bafilo.

The cantons (or subdivisions) of Assoli include Bafilo, Dako, Koumondè, Soudou, Alédjo and Bouladè.

Towns and villages
Abakouande, Afoudi, Agarade, Agbandaode, Agouebou, Akoutia, Aledjame, Aledjo Kadara,
Aleheride, Bafilo, Bodoude, Bola, Bomboua, Dako, Djandje, Djanguela, Doukorode, Effolo, Fadao, Fazade, Flandi, Foulenda, Gande, Gnata, Groungouboui, Hungbeu, Kadieka, Kado, Kajalawa, Kajamboue, Kangandem, Kao, Katai, Kemini, Kiande, Kolanda, Kolo, Koumande, Kpalanda, Kpayando, Kpayaora, Lakodayo, Lamba, Loukou, Noumbanda, Pampouelou, Payambou, Paywawaya, Peou, Pewa, Soreda, Sorogadanga, Soudore
, Soudou, Soulou, Tadoum, Tafdeman, Tamboulado, Taou, Tchambao, Tchonoro, Tchoubona, Tiavaleme, Touazi, Watalangue.

See also
Alédjo Wildlife Reserve

References

External links
Maplandia world maps gazetteer

 
Prefectures of Togo
Kara Region